Brod Bagert (born 1947) is a children's poet from New Orleans. He has written 19 books of poetry for children, young-adults, and adults. His work has received numerous awards including the International Reading Association's prestigious Young Adults Choices award, the Association of Educational Publishers Distinguished Achievement Award, the Independent Publisher Gold Book Award, and Mom's Choices Gold Medal. He lives in New Orleans with his wife Debby;  they have four children.

History
Bagert was born and raised in New Orleans.  In high school, he studied classical literature in the original Latin and Greek, wrestled and boxed. Bagert attended Loyola University in New Orleans for both undergraduate and Law School, from which, in 1971, he received his Juris Doctor.

Bagert practiced as a trial attorney in Louisiana from 1971-1992, and served as an elected official from 1976-1980. In the summer of 1992, Bagert decided to leave his law practice to become a full-time, professional poet.

Early career
Bagert was elected to the New Orleans City Council in 1976 for a partial term representing District D, and was subsequently re-elected to a full term in 1977.  While serving as Councilman, Bagert introduced legislation to designate Esplanade Avenue and a large portion of the New Orleans area referred to as the Treme as a historic district. As Councilman, Bagert helped create the New Orleans Home Mortgage Authority and shepherded the issuance of $85-million in single-family mortgage revenue bonds to fund loans for low to moderate income, first-time home owners.
  
In October 1980 Bagert left the City Council to accept an appointment to the Louisiana Public Service Commission.

After leaving political office, Bagert remained active in utility-related consumer issues. He pursued litigation against Louisiana Power & Light (LP&L) for the return of $1.9 billion dollars in fuel cost adjustment overpayments. He also became one of the lead proponents for the acquisition by the City of New Orleans Public Service Inc. (NOPSI), in a long dispute over the introduction of the cost of the Grand Gulf Nuclear Station into the rate structure applicable to New Orleans rate payers.

Poetry career
Bagert's life as a children's author began when his eight-year-old daughter asked him to write a poem for her to perform in her school elocution program. To make the poem more performance friendly he wrote it in his daughter's voice, the voice of an eight-year-old girl. That was the beginning of what would eventually become one of the identifying characteristics of Bagert's poetry: poems are written in the voice of the audience for whom the poetry is intended.  In a poem for kindergartners, he writes in the voice of a kindergartner. In a poem for sixth-graders, he writes in the voice of a sixth-grader. The result is a body of performance-friendly poetry in which children hear their own voices, engage their own thoughts, and discover their own innermost feelings.

Books

References

1947 births
Living people
Children's poets
Poets from Louisiana
Writers from New Orleans
Loyola University New Orleans alumni
New Orleans City Council members